Ingebjørg Amanda Godskesen (born 26 May 1957) is a Norwegian politician for the Progress Party.

She was elected to the Norwegian Parliament from Aust-Agder from 2009 to 2017.

References

1957 births
Living people
Members of the Storting
Aust-Agder politicians
Progress Party (Norway) politicians
Norwegian Christians
21st-century Norwegian politicians